Fazlur Rahman Khan (died 26 September 2008)  was a Bangladesh Awami League politician and a Jatiya Sangsad member  representing the Mymensingh-23, Netrokona-2 and Netrokona-3 constituencies.

Career
From 1977 to 2003, he served as the President of Netrokona District unit of Bangladesh Awami League.

References

1920s births
2008 deaths
Awami League politicians
1st Jatiya Sangsad members
3rd Jatiya Sangsad members
7th Jatiya Sangsad members